Magdolna Lázár (born 5 May 1951) is a Hungarian middle-distance runner. She competed in the women's 800 Meters at the 1976 Summer Olympics. She was the 2 time world champion of Hungary and she placed 8 times in the Top 10 in her career.

References

1951 births
Living people
Athletes (track and field) at the 1976 Summer Olympics
Hungarian female middle-distance runners
Olympic athletes of Hungary
Place of birth missing (living people)